British Togoland, officially the Mandate Territory of Togoland and later officially the Trust Territory of Togoland, was a territory in West Africa, under the administration of the United Kingdom, which subsequently entered into union with Ghana, part becoming its Volta Region. It was effectively formed in 1916 by the splitting of the German protectorate of Togoland into two territories, French Togoland and British Togoland, during the First World War. Initially, it was a League of Nations Class B mandate. In 1922, British Togoland was formally placed under British rule while French Togoland, now Togo, was placed under French rule.

Following the Second World War, the political status of British Togoland changed – it became a United Nations Trust Territory, although still administered by the United Kingdom. During the decolonization of Africa, a status plebiscite was organised in British Togoland in May 1956 to decide the future of the territory. 58% voters taking part voted to merge the territory with the neighbouring British Crown colony of the Gold Coast which was heading towards independence, rather than remaining a trusteeship and awaiting developments in French Togoland. On 13 December 1956, the United Nations General Assembly passed General Assembly resolution 1044 on "The future of Togoland under British administration". By that resolution, the UN acknowledged the outcome of the plebiscite held in the Territory which was a majority in favour of union with the Gold Coast. The resolution recommended that the United Kingdom effect the union of British Togoland  with Gold Coast upon the independence of Gold Coast. To achieve this, under the Ghana Independence Act 1957 the United Kingdom annexed British Togoland to form part of Her Majesty's dominions comprising the Dominion of Ghana.

In a letter dated 6 March 1957, the United Kingdom Government informed the Secretary-General of the United Nations that with effect from midnight 6 March 1957, under the terms of the Ghana Independence Act 1957, the territories previously comprised in the Gold Coast became the independent State of Ghana and that under the same Act, the union of the former Trust Territory of Togoland under British administration with the independent State of Ghana took place from the same time and date.

British Togoland's capital was Ho, which presently serves as the capital of Volta Region. The region includes much of the former mandate's territory.

United Nations trust territory 

After World War II, the mandate became a United Nations trust territory administered by the United Kingdom. Prior to the mandate and trusteeship periods, British Togoland was administered as part of the adjoining territory of the Gold Coast, under the name of Trans-Volta Togo (TVT).

Togoland Congress

In 1954, the British government informed the UN that it would be unable to administer the Trust Territory after 1957. In response, in December 1955, the UN General Assembly passed a resolution advising the British government to hold a plebiscite on the future of British Togoland.

On 9 May 1956, this plebiscite was held under UN supervision with the choice between formal integration with the future independent Gold Coast or continuation as a Trust Territory.

The Togoland Congress campaigned against integration. There was vocal opposition to the incorporation of Togoland from the Ewe people who voted against in British Togoland, as the Ewe wanted the unification of the Ewe people in British Togoland and French Togoland as a separate Ewe state (modern Togo).

It was reported that the vote results was 42% against from the Ewe people (Togoland Congress), and 58% for integration.

See also 

 Western Togoland

References

Further reading

 Bourret, Florence Mabel. Gold Coast: A survey of the Gold Coast and British Togoland, 1919–1946. (Stanford University Press, 1949). online
 

British Empire
 
Togoland, British
Togoland, British
British West Africa
Ghana and the Commonwealth of Nations
History of Ghana
History of Togo
Togoland, British
Togoland, British
Togoland, British
1916 establishments in Africa
1956 disestablishments in Africa
1916 establishments in the British Empire